Motlalentoa Letsosa (born on 18 December 1974) is the former minister of home affairs of Lesotho. He was appointed in May 2020. He was previously the minister of education and training from November 2016 to June 2017.

Background and education 
Letsosa was born on the 18 December 1974 in Litsoeneng, Mafeteng in Lesotho. He got his First School Leaving Certificate in Litsoeneng Primary School and his Secondary School Certificate in Tsakholo High School. Letsosa earned a Bachelor’s Degree from the National University of Lesotho and his Master’s Degree in Higher Education Studies from the University of Free State. Thereafter, Letsosa got a certificate in Proof Reading and Copy-editing in South African Writers College in 2015.

Career 
Letsosa started his career as a Tutor in Tsakholo High School in 2000 and later became the Head of English Language Department in 2003 and a Vice Principal in 2010. Thereafter, he joined politics and he is the deputy leader of the Democratic Congress.

References 

Living people
Government ministers of Lesotho
1974 births
National University of Lesotho alumni
Members of the National Assembly (Lesotho)
People from Mafeteng District